Pammene suspectana is a moth belonging to the family Tortricidae. The species was first described by Friederike Lienig and Philipp Christoph Zeller in 1846.

It is native to Europe.

References

Grapholitini